Padež is a small village in the hills south of Borovnica in the Inner Carniola region of Slovenia. It lies in the Municipality of Vrhnika.

References

External links

Padež on Geopedia

Populated places in the Municipality of Vrhnika